Patrik Turunen (born 1 July 1988) is a Finnish football player currently playing for KuPS.

Career
Turunen has had trials with FC Bayern Munich II (2005), Piacenza Calcio (2006) and 1. FC Köln. 12 December 2009 he had trials with 2.Bundesliga side SC Paderborn 07.

Club Careers 
Patrik Turunen joined clubs, Delbrücker SC and Kuopion PS.

Turunen played for German team, Delbrücker SC, from 2010 to 2011 as a defender. He also played for Finland team, Kuopion PS, from 2006 to 2010 as a defender.

References
Guardian Football

1988 births
Living people
Kuopion Palloseura players
Finnish footballers
Veikkausliiga players
Association football defenders
People from Kuopio
Sportspeople from North Savo